Thomas-Chaloner Bisse-Challoner (1788–1872)  DL, JP, was a British gentleman and militia colonel. He enlarged the former country house and landscape garden at Portnall Park, Virginia Water (then considered Egham Heath), and so laid the foundation for the Wentworth Estate and housing development in the surrounding area.

Background
Challoner was the only son of the Rev. Thomas Bisse (c.1754- 13 November 1828), of Portnall Park, Virginia Water and his first wife, Katherine Townsend (d.1815/ 16).

He was educated at Eton College (c.1802–1805), and matriculated at Trinity College, Oxford in 1806.

Inheritance
In 1829, in order to inherit according to the will of his maternal great-aunt Mrs Challoner, Bisse changed his name to Bisse-Challoner. This was announced in The London Gazette on 22 January 1829: "...he may (in testimony of his respect for the memory of his maternal great-aunt Lydia, widow and relict of George Challoner, of Hales-hall, in the parish of Cheadle, in the county of Stafford, under whose will he derives considerable property) assume and use the surname of Challoner, in addition to and after that of Bisse, and also bear the arms of Challoner quarterly with those of Bisse".

Career
He served as a lieutenant in the 1st Dragoon Guards (1809–1812). On 26 March 1853 he was commissioned as Lieutenant-Colonel Commandant of the new 3rd Royal Surrey Militia, based in Kingston upon Thames. On his retirement from this command he was appointed the regiment's Honorary Colonel on 2 November 1867, a position he held until his death.

He was appointed a Justice of the Peace (J.P.) of Berkshire (1831) and of Surrey, and a Deputy Lieutenant (D.L.) for Surrey. He became High Sheriff of Surrey in 1838.

He stood for the West Surrey constituency in the 1852 general election but lost with 1385 votes to Evelyn (with 1646 votes) and Henry Drummond (1610 votes) elected as Conservatives.

He was a member of the council and trustee of the Royal Agricultural Society of England from c. 1839–. He was chairman of the Finance Committee, Vice-chairman of the General Derby Committee, and wrote several papers which appeared in the society journal. Papers included, Practical instructions for improving and economically maintaining turnpike and parish roads upon the mile system, volume 2, 1841; Report on the Exhibition and Trial of Implements at the Exeter Meeting, volume 11, 1850; and On the Accurate Levelling of Drains, volume 11, 1850.

Personal life

He married, firstly, Anne, eldest daughter of Nicholas Loftus Tottenham, formerly an Irish Member of Parliament, in June 1812. He married, secondly, on 6 January 1859, (Hadie) Henrietta Emma Helena De Salis (2 May 1824 – 16 August 1863), third surviving and youngest daughter of Jerome, 4th Count de Salis-Soglio.

Notes and references

Notes

References

Other sources
 Select Illustrations of the County of Surrey: Comprising picturesque Views of the Seats of the Nobility and Gentry. Interesting remains, and with Descriptions ... , by George Frederick Prosser, and published by Rivington, London, 1828.
R. de Salis, Beneficiary Bisse : Colonel Chaloner Bisse-Challoner, heir and his heirs. London, 2008.
 Edith Mary Johnston-Liik, History of the Irish Parliament 1692–1800, p. 422-3, volume six of six, 2002 (re. Tottenham family).
 The Parliamentary Companion, for 1854, Charles R. Dod, London, Whittaker & Co., 1854.
 Two scrolls from the College of Arms, and a schedule of Col. Challoner's estate in 1872.
 Boyle's Fashionable Court and Country Guide, 1842, &tc, edited by M. Boyle, 290 Regent Street (five shillings), London.
 Musgrave's Obituary, Harleian Society no. 44, six volumes, 1899–1901 (Sir William Musgrave, Bart.)
Rachel and Cecil de Salis, Notes of Past Days, Henley-on-Thames, 1939 (chapter 3, My Uncle Challoner, pps. 121–126).
R. G. Thorne, History of Parliament, The Commons 1790–1820, Secker & Warburg, 1986.Walford's County Families, 1865.The Mayors of Norwich 1403 to 1835, by Basil Cozens-Hardy, FSA and Ernest A. Kent, FSA, Jarrold and sons, Ltd, Norwich, 1938. (a note on Phillip Stebbing, page 101).Seventeenth-Century Norwich, Politics, Religion and Government, 1620–1690, John T. Evans, Oxford, 1979.
Percy Millican, The Register of The Freeman of Norwich, 1548–1713, Jarrold, Norwich, 1934.Reports of Cases Argued and Determined in the High Court of Chancery: In the Time of Lord Chancellor Hardwicke [1736–1754], by John Tracy Atkyns, Philip Yorke Hardwicke, Great Britain Court of Chancery, William Newnam, Great Britain, Court of Chancery, Printed for J. Wenman, Oxford, 1781. (Frederick v Aynscombe, 1739).
Peter G. M. Dickson, The Sun Insurance Office, 1710–1960, Oxford, 1960.
Kim Sloan, 'A New Chronology for Alexander Cozens part II: 1759–86', The Burlington Magazine, Volume 127, No. 987 (June 1985), pp. 355–363.
Christie's London, British drawings sale, 15 June 1982, lots 5 – 10 (works associated with Charlotte Aynscombe (1760–1799)).
L.C.C., Survey of London, volume 22, Bankside, Sir H. Roberts & Walter Godfrey (editors), 1950.Topographical Dictionary, London and its Environs, etc., by James Elmes, M.R.I.A., Architect; Surveyor to the Port of London; London. Whittaker, Treacher and Arnot, MDCCCXXXI (1831).
 Sermons on Practical Subjects, by the late Reverend Henry Stebbing [d.1788], D.D., preacher to the Hon. Society of Gray's Inn, Chaplain in Ordinary to His Majesty, and Fellow of the Royal and Antiquarian Societies, London, with an essay by Henry Stebbing [1752–1818], printed for C. Dilly, in the Poultry, 1788.The Lady Magazine, 1831. (Mr & Mrs Bisse Challoner were presented to the Queen at her birthday ball at Christ's Hospital.The Registers of Wadham College, Oxford, part 1, 1613–1719, by Rev. Robert Barlow Gardiner, MA, FSA, George Bell, Covent Garden, 1889.The Registers of Wadham College, Oxford, part 2, 1719–1871, by Rev. Robert Barlow Gardiner, MA, FSA, George Bell, Covent Garden, 1895.
Prerogative Court of Canterbury (P.C.C.) wills for, amongst others: Daniel Wight (1705); Elizabeth Aynscombe (1713); Philip Stebbing (1715); Jane Elliott (1718); Thomas Aynscombe (1740); Robert Smith (1748); George Challoner (1770); Charlotte Anne Aynscombe (1799); Lydia Challoner (1803); Rev. Thomas Bisse (1828); Valentina Aynscombe (1841); and Mary Barnard (1842). (Available on-line from P.R.O. Kew, aka National Archives).
 The Virginia Water Picture Book'' by Ron and Dorothy Davis, Egham-by-Runnymede Historical Society, Surrey, 1989.

1788 births
1872 deaths
People educated at Eton College
Alumni of Trinity College, Oxford
Deputy Lieutenants of Surrey
High Sheriffs of Surrey
Surrey Militia officers
People from Egham
Burials in Surrey
People from Virginia Water